The Indie Megabooth is a section at game expositions dedicated to the display and promotion of indie games. It launched at PAX East 2012 and appeared at other PAX events before expanding to other shows including the Eurogamer Expo, Electronic Entertainment Expo, Game Developers Conference, and Gamescom. It was founded by Kelly Wallick, who became the booth's full-time organizer in 2013.

In 2020, the Indie Megabooth's organizers chose to "sunset" the Indie Megabooth for the duration of the COVID-19 pandemic.

References

External links 

 

Gaming conventions